The Department of Environment and Climate Change of the Canadian province of Nova Scotia is responsible for environmental protection. The department administers the provisions of the Environment Act.

History
Established in 1973 to administer the Environmental Protection Act, the then-Department of the Environment was responsible for developing and implementing policies related to environmental management and protection.

In 2000, the Hamm government announced a restructuring of government departments that led to the grouping of the Department of Labour with the Department of the Environment, which was renamed Department of Environment and Labour. In 2008, it was made a separate department again.

In 2021, the department gained its current name.

Divisions
 Inspection, Compliance, and Enforcement Division
 Policy Division
 Sustainability and Applied Science Division

See also
 Government of Nova Scotia

References

External links
 

1973 establishments in Nova Scotia
Environment and Climate Change
Subnational environment ministries